Stone Street may refer to:

Places
 Stone Street (Manhattan), New York, United States in the Financial District
 Stone Street (Kent), England, the Antonine Itinerary's fourth route
 Stone Street (Suffolk), England, a mainly rural neighbourhood of Boxford
 Stone Street, East Suffolk, a location
 Stone Street Historic District (New Hamburg, New York), United States
 Stone Street, Sevenoaks, a hamlet in the parish of Seal, Kent, England

Other
 Stone Street (horse) (born 1905), American Thoroughbred racehorse

See also
Stonestreet (disambiguation)
 Stane Street (disambiguation)
 Stanegate, a Roman road parallel to Hadrian's Wall on its south side between Corbridge and Carlisle
 Roman roads in Britain